Capillariidae is a family of parasitic nematodes. All its members are parasites in vertebrates when they are in their adult stage.

Taxonomy
The family Capillariidae was created by Railliet in 1915. It is accepted in the most recent classifications of the Nematoda, in which it is one of the members of the order Trichocephalida. However, Capillaria and closely related genera are sometimes included in the family Trichinellidae in other classifications.
The taxonomy of the Capillariidae is disputed: according to different classifications, the family includes the single genus Capillaria or 22 different genera (Amphibiocapillaria, Aonchotheca, Baruscapillaria, Calodium, Capillaria, Capillostrongyloides, Crocodylocapillaria, Echinocoleus, Eucoleus, Freitascapillaria, Gessyella, Liniscus, Paracapillaria, Paracapillaroides, Pearsonema, Paratrichosoma, Pseudocapillaria, Piscicapillaria, Pseudocapillaroides, Pterothominx, Schulmanela, and Tenoranema). In 2017, a new genus was added to this list: Lobocapillaria. Old literature, and sometimes modern medical literature, use Capillaria as a genus for species included in all these genera. In contrast, certain species parasitic in fish, previously classified in Capillaria, are now considered members of the genus Huffmanela  (family Trichosomoididae).
The term Capillariasis is generally used for diseases produced by species of Capillaria, even if the species is now placed in another genus.

Species 
Species included in the Capillariidae include:
 Capillaria aerophila; modern name Eucoleus aerophilus
 Capillaria gastrica
 Capillaria hepatica; modern name Calodium hepaticum
 Capillaria philippinensis; modern name Paracapillaria philippinensis
 Capillaria plica; modern name Pearsonema plica
 Paracapillaria xenentodoni

See also 
Capillariasis, a disease caused by various species of Capillariidae
Intestinal capillariasis, a disease caused by Capillaria philippinensis (modern name Paracapillaria philippinensis)
Hepatic capillariasis, a disease caused by Capillaria hepatica (modern name Calodium hepaticum)

References

Further reading
Moravec, F. "Proposal of a new systematic arrangement of nematodes of the family Capillariidae." Folia Parasitologica 29.2 (1981): 119-132.
Skri︠a︡bin, Konstantin Ivanovich. "Trichocephalidae and Capillariidae of animals and man and the diseases caused by them." (1970).
Moravec, F., J. Prokopic, and A. V. Shlikas. "The biology of nematodes of the family Capillariidae Neveu-Lemaire, 1936." Folia parasitologica 34.1 (1986): 39-56.
Køie, Marianne, and Are Nylund. "The life-cycle of Capillaria gracilis (Capillariidae), a nematode parasite of gadoid fish." Sarsia 86.4-5 (2001): 383-387.

External links 

WORMS

Trichocephalida
Parasitic nematodes of vertebrates
Nematode families